The Haryana Legislative Assembly or the Haryana Vidhan Sabha is the unicameral state legislature of Haryana state in India.

The seat of the Vidhan Sabha is at Chandigarh, the capital of the state. The Vidhan Sabha comprises 90 Members of Legislative Assembly, directly elected from single-seat constituencies. The term of office is five years.

History
The body was founded in 1966, when the state was created from part of the state of Punjab, by the Punjab Reorganisation Act, 1966. The house initially had 54 seats, ten reserved for scheduled castes, this was increased to 81 seats in March 1967, and to 90 seats (including 17 reserved seats) in 1977. Highest number of seats ever won was in 1977 when Janata Party won 75 out of 90 seats when in the aftermath of 1975–77 emergency by Indian National Congress's (INC) Indira Gandhi. INC won only 3 seats, Vishal Haryana Party and independents both won 5 seats each.

Since the formation of Haryana in 1966, the state politics became infamously dominated by the nepotistic clans of 5 political dynasts, Lal trio (Devi Lal, Bansi Lal and Bhajan Lal) as well as the Hooda clan and  Rao Birender clan. The infamous Aaya Ram Gaya Ram politics, named after Gaya Lal in 1967, of frequent floor-crossing, turncoating, switching parties and political horse trading within short span of time became associated with Haryana.

Presiding Officers

Members of Legislative Assembly

See also
 Aaya Ram Gaya Ram
 Dynastic politics of Haryana
 Elections in Haryana

References

External links

Map of Haryana Assembly constituencies, created by Haryana Space Applications Centre, Hisar

 
State legislatures of India
Legislative Assembly
Unicameral legislatures